Kutyna is a surname. Notable people with the surname include:

Marty Kutyna (born 1932), American professional baseball pitcher 
Donald J. Kutyna (born 1933), United States Air Force general

See also
Kutina (disambiguation)